The Hebei Museum is located in Shijiazhuang, the capital city of Hebei Province, China. It first opened in April 1953 in Baoding. After moving twice in the 1980s, it reopened in October 1987 at its present location on South Zhongshan Street. As the only provincial-level museum in Hebei, its primary function is the collection and exhibition of ancient cultural relics.

Artifacts
Artifacts in their collection include the Western Han jade burial suits sewn with gold thread from the Mancheng tombs of Liu Sheng and his wife Dou Wan; the Changxin Palace lantern, also from the tomb of Dou Wan; and a 2300-year-old bronze lamp, found in the tomb of King Cuo of Zhongshan.

Visitor information
Hebei Museum is open Tuesday until Sunday, from 9:00 AM to 5:00 PM. Entrance is free with valid proof of identification.

See also
 List of museums in China

References

Museums established in 1953
Museums in Hebei
1953 establishments in China
Buildings and structures in Shijiazhuang
National first-grade museums of China